Host country Colombia competed at the 2013 World Games held in Cali, Colombia.

Medalists

Archery 

Sara López won the bronze medal in the women's compound event.

Ju-jitsu

Karate 

In total three gold medals and one silver medal were won by Colombian karateka.

Racquetball

References 

Nations at the 2013 World Games
2013 in Colombian sport
2013